Back to the Sunset is an album by Cuban-American singer-songwriter Dafnis Prieto, released in 2018.

Track listing

References

2018 albums